Hastings Island may refer to:

 Hastings Island (Papua New Guinea)
 Hastings Island (Western Australia)
 Hastings Island (Myanmar), in the Mergui Archipelago